This is a list of songs that have reached number 10 or higher on the Billboard Hot 100. Introduced in 1958, the Hot 100 is the pre-eminent singles chart in the United States, currently monitoring the most popular singles in terms of popular radio play, single purchases and online streaming.

Preface
The following year-by-year, week-by-week listings are based on statistics accrued by Billboard Magazine since the inception of its Hot 100 popularity chart in August 1958.

All data is pooled from record purchases and radio/jukebox play within the United States. Later charts also include digital single sales, online streaming, and YouTube hits.

Top-ten singles by year

See also 
 List of Billboard number-one singles
 Billboard Year-End

Sources
The following sources apply to all "by year" pages linked above:
Joel Whitburn's Top Pop Singles 1955-2008, 12th Edition
Joel Whitburn Presents the Billboard Pop Charts, 1955-1959
Joel Whitburn Presents the Billboard Hot 100 Charts: The Sixties
Joel Whitburn Presents the Billboard Hot 100 Charts: The Seventies
Joel Whitburn Presents the Billboard Hot 100 Charts: The Eighties
Joel Whitburn Presents the Billboard Hot 100 Charts: The Nineties
Joel Whitburn Presents the Billboard Hot 100 Charts: The 2000s
 Additional information obtained can be verified within the chart archives on Billboard.com, as well as through print editions of the magazine.

top-ten hits (United States)